Brzeźnik may refer to the following places in Poland:
Brzeźnik, Lower Silesian Voivodeship (south-west Poland)
Brzeźnik, Masovian Voivodeship (east-central Poland)